Cheongun-dong is a dong, neighbourhood of Jongno-gu in Seoul, South Korea.

Attraction
 Gyeongbokgung
 Cheongwadae

See also 
Administrative divisions of South Korea

References

External links
 Jongno-gu Official site in English
 Jongno-gu Official site
 Status quo of Jongno-gu by administrative dong 
 Resident office info and map of Jongno-gu
 Cheongun-dong Resident office 
 The origin of Cheongun-dong's name

Neighbourhoods of Jongno-gu